The 1969 European Cup Winners' Cup Final was the final football match of the 1968–69 European Cup Winners' Cup and the ninth European Cup Winners' Cup final. It was contested between Slovan Bratislava of Czechoslovakia and Barcelona of Spain, and was held at St. Jakob Stadium in Basel, Switzerland. Slovan won the match 3–2 thanks to a goal by Ľudovít Cvetler, Vladimír Hrivnák and Ján Čapkovič.

Route to the final

Match

Details

See also
1969 European Cup Final
1969 Inter-Cities Fairs Cup Final
FC Barcelona in international football competitions
ŠK Slovan Bratislava in European football

External links
UEFA Cup Winners' Cup results at Rec.Sport.Soccer Statistics Foundation
1969 European Cup Winners' Cup Final at UEFA.com
Match report

3
Cup Winners' Cup Final 1969
Cup Winners' Cup Final 1969
1969
UEFA Cup Winners' Cup Finals
Euro
Euro
European Cup Winners' Cup Final
Sports competitions in Basel
20th century in Basel